It's a Tensta thing is Swedish rapper Adam Tensta's debut studio album, released on 30 November 2007. The album won the 2008 Hip Hop / Soul of the Year Grammis (Swedish grammy) and was nominated for a 2008 P3 Guld award.

Adam Tensta's song, "My Cool", appeared on the soundtracks for the skateboarding video game, Tony Hawk: Ride and the basketball video game, NBA 2K10.

Track listing
 "It's a Tensta Thing"
 "Bangin' On the System"
 "My Cool"
 "Walk With Me"
 "Dopeboy" (feat. Eboi)
 "See U Watchin" (feat. Nitti Gritti)
 "Do the Right Thing"
 "They Wanna Know"
 "I'm Sayin'" (feat. Isay)
 "80's Baby"
 "S.t.o.l.d." (feat. Eboi)
 "Incredible" (feat. Isay)
 "Before U Know It"
 "Same Face"

Singles
 "Before U Know It"
 "They Wanna Know"
 "My Cool"
 "Bangin' On the System"
 "Dopeboy"

Charts

References

2007 debut albums
Adam Tensta albums